Superjudge is the second full-length album released by American rock band Monster Magnet, released on April 6, 1993. It is the first Monster Magnet album to feature lead guitarist Ed Mundell, who replaced founding member John McBain in 1992. Tracks "Twin Earth" and "Face Down" were released as singles with accompanying music videos.

Overview
Superjudge was Monster Magnet's second official album, with their debut release Tab being an EP, and also their debut with major label A&M Records. It was recorded and mixed by Steve Rosenthal at New York's "The Magic Shop" studio in October, 1992, with all original material composed by the band's lead vocalist Dave Wyndorf.

The album fared poorly commercially, largely due to its release coinciding with the advent of the grunge era, which ultimately resulted in a dramatic decline in the popularity of heavy metal in general. Though a commercial disappointment in the months following its release in 1993, Superjudge has since become a very influential album within the stoner rock genre.

The album includes covers of Willie Dixon's "Evil" (utilizing an arrangement used by the band Cactus on their 1971 cover of the song), and Hawkwind's "Brainstorm" from their 1972 album, Doremi Fasol Latido.

Track listing
All songs written by Dave Wyndorf unless noted otherwise.

An import version of Superjudge is also available, containing live bonus tracks.

Bonus Tracks (Import Version)
"Nod Scene" [Live] – 6:26
 "Snake Dance" [Live] – 3:33
 "Medicine" [Live] – 4:24

Personnel
Monster Magnet
 Dave Wyndorf - guitar, vocals, producer
 Ed Mundell - lead guitar
 Joe Calandra - bass
 Jon Kleiman - drums

Additional musicians
 Tim Cronin - "Mountain of Judgement" according to album's liner notes

Technical staff and artwork
 Steve Rosenthal - mixing
 Edward Douglas - assistant engineer
 Joe Warda - assistant engineer
 Bogdan Hernik - assistant engineer
 Bernie Grundman – mastering
 Rich Frankel - art direction
 Rob Leecock - cover "Bull God" painting
 Michael Lavine - photography

References

Monster Magnet albums
1993 albums
A&M Records albums